The D'Amelio Show is an American reality television series which focuses on the personal lives of the D'Amelio family; sisters Charli and Dixie and their parents Heidi and Marc.

The first season premiered on September 3, 2021. The series became the most-watched unscripted series among all first-season titles in the genre, and was renewed for a second season, which premiered on September 28, 2022. In December 2022, the series was renewed for a third season.

Cast

Main 
 Charli D'Amelio
 Dixie D'Amelio
 Heidi D'Amelio
 Marc D'Amelio

Recurring 
 Noah Beck

Episodes

Season 1 (2021)

Season 2 (2022)

Reception

References

External links 
 
 

2020s American reality television series
2021 American television series debuts
English-language television shows
Hulu original programming
Television series about families
Television series about sisters
Television shows set in Los Angeles